Tapinoma modestum is a species of ant in the genus Tapinoma. Described by Santschi in 1932, the species is endemic to Benin and Zimbabwe.

References

Tapinoma
Hymenoptera of Africa
Insects described in 1932